Tiebiri Godswill (born 22 August 1972) is a Nigerian wrestler. He competed in the men's Greco-Roman 52 kg at the 1996 Summer Olympics.

References

1972 births
Living people
Nigerian male sport wrestlers
Olympic wrestlers of Nigeria
Wrestlers at the 1996 Summer Olympics
Place of birth missing (living people)
20th-century Nigerian people